Michael R. Sheldon (born April 6, 1949) was a Judge of the Connecticut Appellate Court. He stepped down on April 1, 2019, shortly before reaching the mandatory retirement age of 70 years.

Education

Sheldon earned his Bachelor of Arts in Public and International Affairs and a Certificate of Proficiency in Russian Studies from Princeton University in 1971 and his Juris Doctor from Yale Law School in 1974.

Legal career

Sheldon participated in the E. Barrett Prettyman Legal Internship Program at the Georgetown University Law Center. In that capacity, he was trained in criminal trial and appellate advocacy while supervising upper-class law students in the representation of criminal defendants in the Law Center's Clinical Programs. In 1976, he was hired by the University of Connecticut School of Law as a professor of law and appointed director of the Criminal Clinic. He worked at the Law School until 1991, teaching courses in criminal law and procedure, establishing and operating the Moot Court Interterm Program, and training and supervising upper-class law students in the representation of criminal defendants in the Trial and Appellate Divisions of the Criminal Clinic.

Superior court service

He was appointed to the Superior Court by Governor Lowell P. Weicker Jr. in 1991. In his 20 years of service as a Superior Court judge, his assignments included terms in the Civil and Criminal Divisions of the Hartford, New Britain and Litchfield Superior Courts, as well as a four-year term pioneering the Complex Litigation Docket in Waterbury.

Appellate court service

He was nominated to the Connecticut Appellate Court by Governor Dan Malloy on October 20, 2011. Sheldon retired from the Appellate Court on April 1, 2019, shortly before reaching the mandatory retirement age of 70. He was succeeded by Judge Robert Devlin.

References

External links
Official Biography on State of Connecticut Judicial Branch website

1949 births
Living people
20th-century American judges
20th-century American lawyers
21st-century American judges
Judges of the Connecticut Appellate Court
Princeton University alumni
Superior court judges in the United States
University of Connecticut faculty
Yale Law School alumni